Cargill MacMillan or variation, may refer to:

 Cargill-MacMillan family; U.S. business family
 Cargill MacMillan Jr. (1927–2011) U.S. businessman
 Cargill MacMillan Sr. (1900–1968) U.S. businessman

See also

 Cargill (disambiguation)
 McMillan (disambiguation)